Rougned Roberto Odor (born February 3, 1994), nicknamed "Rougie", is a Venezuelan professional baseball second baseman in the San Diego Padres organization. He previously played in Major League Baseball (MLB) for the Texas Rangers, New York Yankees and Baltimore Orioles. He played for Texas’s minor league affiliates from 2011 until he was called up to the MLB team in 2014. The Rangers traded Odor to the Yankees in 2021 and he was released on November 23, 2021. He was later signed by the Orioles.

Early life and family
Odor was born in Maracaibo, Venezuela, on February 3, 1994. His first name is a combination of his grandfather's name, Douglas, and his grandmother's name, Nedia; in keeping with the family custom of giving boys names that begin with the letter "R", the "D" in Douglas was changed to an "R," yielding Rougned.

His father, also named Rougned, played college baseball for the University of New Orleans. He has a sister and a younger brother, Rougned José Odor, who signed with the Texas Rangers organization on February 19, 2015. His uncle, Rouglas, played for eight seasons in Minor League Baseball for the Cleveland and Milwaukee Brewers organizations, and is now a manager with the Akron RubberDucks. Three of his uncles on his mother's side played baseball. All three played for the Aguilas de Zulia in the Venezuelan Professional Baseball League, while Eduardo Zambrano also played in MLB for the Chicago Cubs.

Though raised in Maracaibo, he also visited his mother's family in the country during weekends. He spent time around horses, and he enjoys toros coleados, a sport involving horses.

Odor began playing baseball at the age of two. He played in the 2009 World Youth Baseball Championship. He was named to the tournament's all-star team as a second baseman.

Professional career

Minor leagues
Odor signed with the Texas Rangers as an international free agent in 2011, receiving a $425,000 signing bonus. The Rangers aggressively assigned him to the Spokane Indians of the Class A-Short Season Northwest League. He was the youngest player in the Northwest League, and had a .262 batting average on the season. Odor was suspended for four games after starting a brawl during a game with the Vancouver Canadians. In 2012, Odor batted .259 with the Hickory Crawdads of the Class A South Atlantic League.

Odor began the 2013 season with the Myrtle Beach Pelicans of the Class A-Advanced Carolina League, where he had a .303 batting average in 99 games played. In August 2013, Odor was promoted to the Frisco RoughRiders of the Class AA Texas League. Odor's emergence with the Rangers allowed them to trade utility infielder Leury Garcia to the Chicago White Sox for all-star right fielder Alex Rios that month. He finished the season with a .305 batting average with 41 doubles, six triples, 11 home runs, and 78 runs batted in in 130 games for Myrtle Beach and Frisco. The Rangers named Odor their minor league player of the year.

The Rangers invited Odor to spring training in 2014. He began the year with Frisco.

Texas Rangers

2014
The Rangers promoted Odor to the major leagues on May 8, 2014. On May 9, against Boston Red Sox pitcher Clay Buchholz, Odor hit a single for his first major league hit. On May 12, against Houston Astros pitcher Brad Peacock, Odor hit his first major league home run. He hit his first grand slam on August 27, in a 12–4 decision against the Seattle Mariners. Odor was the youngest player in the MLB during his rookie season and helped the Rangers' second base problem even though they finished 67–95, the third-worst record in baseball that year.

Odor finished the year hitting a .259 batting average, 39 runs, 14 doubles, nine home runs, four stolen bases, and 48 RBIs in 386 at-bats over 110 games. He was the youngest player in the American League, was 8th in the league in triples (7), and was 10th in caught stealing (7).

2015
Odor began 2015 as the Rangers' starting second baseman, but he struggled mightily, hitting .144 with one home run, nine RBIs, and 25 strikeouts to go with seven walks in 29 games. He was optioned to the Round Rock Express of the Class AAA Pacific Coast League on May 11. However, upon his demotion, Odor found his stroke, beating up Triple-A pitching to a .352/.426/.639 slash with five home runs, 19 RBIs, and only 10 strikeouts to 12 walks in roughly the same number of appearances. On June 15, following an injury to Delino DeShields Jr., Odor was recalled to the Rangers, and in his return, promptly went 3-for-3 with two RBI against the Dodgers. Rougned proceeded to hit very hot in the month of June, hitting .391 with two home runs and nine RBIs and hit .319 with five home runs and 16 RBI in July.

He ended the regular season hitting .261, with 16 home runs, 61 RBIs, and 54 runs scored. He led all AL second basemen in errors, with 17.

2016
On May 15, 2016, Odor started an on-field brawl by punching Jose Bautista in the face during the eighth inning of a game against the Toronto Blue Jays after Bautista slid into Odor at second base during a double play. Odor first pushed and then swung at Bautista, hitting him squarely in the face. There was speculation that this incident spilled over from the bad blood that resulted from Game 5 of 2015's American League Division Series between the Rangers and the Blue Jays, a game that included Blue Jays fans throwing trash onto the field and Bautista flipping his bat emphatically after hitting the Blue Jays' go-ahead home run. Odor received an eight-game suspension from MLB two days later for his actions that resulted in the brawl. After an appeal, Odor's suspension was revised, eventually finalized at seven games.

In 150 games, Odor finished the year with a .271 batting average, 33 home runs, 33 doubles, and 88 RBI. He walked in 3.0% of his at-bats, the lowest percentage in the major leagues, and had the lowest walks-per-strikeout ratio in the majors (0.14). He saw the highest percentage of curveballs of all MLB hitters (16.0%). He led all AL second basemen in errors, with 22.

On October 9, Odor was charged with a throwing error which allowed the Toronto Blue Jays to score the winning run in the 10th inning of Game 3 of the ALDS, thus eliminating the Rangers despite holding the best record in the AL in 2016.

2017
Before the 2017 season, Odor played for the Venezuelan national baseball team in the 2017 World Baseball Classic. On March 25, Odor signed a six-year extension worth $49.5 million. The deal was finalized on March 30. In the Rangers' season opener against the Cleveland Indians, Odor hit two home runs in his first two at-bats of the season.

For the 2017 season, he batted .204/.252/.397, had the lowest on base percentage of all qualified major league batters, and had the lowest batting average on balls in play (.224) of all major league players. For the third consecutive season he led all AL second basemen in errors, with 19.

2018–2020
In 2018, Odor batted .253/.326/.424 with 18 home runs and 63 RBI. He stole 12 bases, but led the American League in caught stealing, with 12. In 2019, he batted .205/.283/.439/.721 with 30 home runs and 93 RBIs. He led the American League with 178 strikeouts. In 2019, on defense he led all American League second basemen in errors, with 15. In 2020, Odor batted .167/209/.413 with 10 home runs and 30 RBI. Odor only played in 38 games on the year because of the shortened season due to the COVID-19 pandemic.

On March 29, 2021, Odor was informed that he had not made the Rangers' Opening Day roster. He was designated for assignment when the Rangers' set their Opening Day roster on April 1.

New York Yankees
On April 6, 2021, the Rangers traded Odor to the New York Yankees for Josh Stowers and Antonio Cabello. In July and August, he moved to third base for 23 games to fill in for Gio Urshela.

The Yankees designated Odor for assignment on November 19. Odor was released by the Yankees on November 23.

Baltimore Orioles
Odor signed a one-year contract with the Baltimore Orioles on November 30, 2021. He struggled with the team in 2022, ending with a negative WAR. He ended the 2022 season with the Orioles with a .207/.275/.357/.632 slash line.

San Diego Padres
On March 1, 2023, Odor signed a one-year minor league contract with the San Diego Padres, receiving a non-roster invitation to spring training.

Personal life
As part of the contract Odor signed in 2017, Rangers owner Ray Davis included a pair of quarter horses. These are the seventh and eighth horses Odor owns. Odor plans to build a ranch in the North Texas area, so that his family can move from Venezuela.

See also
 List of Major League Baseball players from Venezuela

References

External links

1994 births
Living people
Baltimore Orioles players
Frisco RoughRiders players
Hickory Crawdads players
Major League Baseball players from Venezuela
Major League Baseball second basemen
Myrtle Beach Pelicans players
Navegantes del Magallanes players
Nashville Sounds players
New York Yankees players
Spokane Indians players
Sportspeople from Maracaibo
Round Rock Express players
Texas Rangers players
Venezuelan expatriate baseball players in the United States
World Baseball Classic players of Venezuela
2017 World Baseball Classic players